The Thalys PBKA is a TGV variant ordered and operated by Thalys between its namesake cities Paris, Brussels, Cologne and Amsterdam, forming the abbreviation PBKA. They have a capacity of 377 seats. They were intended to be Thalys' sole rolling stock, but their extreme cost and complexity led SNCF to order a simpler sister class, the Thalys PBA, a TGV Réseau derivative, with which they can work in multiple.

All of the trains are quadri-current, capable of operating under  (LGVs and a part of the French lignes classiques), 15 kV 16.7 Hz AC (Germany), 3 kV DC (Belgium) and 1.5 kV DC (the Netherlands and the remainder of the French lignes classiques).

Seventeen trains were ordered: nine by SNCB/NMBS, six by SNCF and two by NS. Deutsche Bahn contributed to financing two of the SNCB sets.

Fleet details

See also
 SNCF TGV POS
 List of high-speed trains

References

External links

 TGV Thalys official site 

European high-speed trains
Pbka
Electric multiple units with locomotive-like power cars
3000 V DC multiple units
15 kV AC multiple units
25 kV AC multiple units
1500 V DC multiple units of France
Alstom multiple units